The ampulla of vas deferens, also called the ampulla of ductus deferens, is an enlargement  of the vas deferens at the fundus of the bladder which acts as a reservoir for sperm. This structure is seen in some mammalian and squamate species and is sometimes tortuous in shape.

External links
  - "The Male Pelvis: The Urinary Bladder"

Mammal male reproductive system